Evelyn Mathieu (born 14 October 1965) is a Puerto Rican sprinter. She competed in the women's 4 × 400 metres relay at the 1984 Summer Olympics.

References

1965 births
Living people
Athletes (track and field) at the 1984 Summer Olympics
Puerto Rican female sprinters
Olympic track and field athletes of Puerto Rico
Place of birth missing (living people)